The Samora Machel Monument in Mbuzini, near Komatipoort in the Mpumalanga province of South Africa, marks the spot where the plane carrying the then-President of Mozambique crashed in 1986. It resulted in the deaths of President Machel and several Mozambican ministers. It was declared a National Heritage Site in 2006.

The monument was inaugurated by Joaquim Chissano and Nelson Mandela on 19 January 1999. It was constructed at a cost of $240,000 and incorporates some of the wreckage of the plane. Its central feature is 35 tubes of steel, symbolising the number of lives lost in the air crash, that create a wailing sound in the wind.

A planned R11.2 million upgrade was to add access roads, an amphitheater, a helipad and buildings.
In 2006 a nearby library with a collection of books in English and Portuguese was opened. A statue of Machel, donated by Norwegian anti-apartheid artists, was also erected at the site.

References

External links
Speech at the Unveiling of the Samora Machel Memorial by Nelson Mandela

Monuments and memorials in South Africa
Mozambique–South Africa relations
1999 establishments in South Africa